Dan Corson  (born 1964) is an artist living in Hawaii and is a former member of the Seattle Arts Commission. He works in the field of public art, creating large-scale, concept-driven works installed in urban environments including in parks, railway stations, art galleries, meditation chambers, at intersections, under freeways, and on sidewalks.  His approach is a mixture of sculpture, installation, theatrical design, architecture, and landscape design.  Media include metal, glass, concrete, fiberglass, gravel, LEDs, lasers, neon, solar panels, radar detectors, photo-voltaic cells, infrared cameras, motors, searchlights, and occasionally elements such as fire, water, and smoke.  His work frequently incorporates cutting-edge technology in lighting, sound, and other electronic media.

Career
Corson served as the first Artist-in-Residence for the City of Seattle's "% for Arts program" in 2001.  His work is often interactive and incorporates elements such as photoelectric switches which the spectator can trigger and cause the artwork to respond.  Typical is Emerald Aura a temporary laser sculpture in Memphis Tennessee that used Infrared cameras and surveillance software to track pedestrians and project the processed computer generated images back onto the people in real time.  This installation is typical of Corson’s work in the way that it combine artistic expression with an implied statement about our culture.

Some of Corson's works interact not with people, but with the environment.  Examples include Nepenthes, whimsical fiberglass sculptures on sidewalks in Portland that are covered with photo-voltaic cells that glow at night, and Sonic Bloom at Seattle's Pacific Science Center which features solar panels and gigantic metal flowers that light up at night.  The flowers also hum when people approach them. In 1994 the city of Seattle selected Corson to integrate art into the new  Cedar River Watershed Education Center. In characteristic fashion he exploited the natural resources of the site–for example using falling water to create a musical artwork in the Rain Drum Courtyard.

His theatrical set and lighting designs have been featured at the ACT Theatre, Annex Theatre, and On the Boards in Seattle, at Young Vic in London, and at the San Diego Rep and the Old Globe in San Diego.

Life
Corson was born in Glendale, California.  He received a Bachelor of Arts in theatrical design from San Diego State University in 1986 and a Master of Fine Arts in sculpture from the University of Washington in 1992.  He was a Scholar at the Skowhegan School of Painting and Sculpture in 1991.  He studied glass-blowing and neon fabrication at the Pilchuck Glass School in 1993, 1994, and 1996.

After graduating from San Diego State University, he went to London for two years doing theater design and working with lighting designer David Hersey.

Corson has been together with his husband Berndt Stugger since 1997 and their Washington State Civil Union was converted into an official Marriage in 2014.  Both Corson and Stugger are avid gardeners with a passion for tropical gardening. This botanical fascination can clearly be seen in Corson’s work.  In 2010 they purchased some old sugarcane land in Hawaii Island and have transformed it into a small cacao farm.

Works
Corson has often collaborated in public art projects, for example working with fellow artists Norie Sato, Sheila Klein, and Tad Savinar on Seattle's Sound Transit Link Light Rail project in 1998.  Corson is a prolific artist and it is not practical to list all of his creations; a selected list of works is shown below.

 2002 Wave Rave Cave, Seattle
 2003 Antennae Reeds, Seattle (with Norie Sato)
 2005  Rain Drum Courtyard, North Bend, Washington
 2007 Safety Spires, Seattle
 2007 Emerald Laser Lawn, Fort Lauderdale, Florida
 2007 Luminous Conjunctions, Fort Lauderdale, Florida
 2008 Emerald Aura, Memphis, Tennessee
 2009 The Root, Bellevue, Washington
 2009 Grotesque Arabesque, Seattle
 2009 Empyrean Passage,  West Hollywood, California
 2009 Oscillating Field, Seattle
 2013 Nepenthes, Portland, Oregon
 2013 Sonic Bloom, Seattle
 2013 Rays, Council Bluffs, Iowa
 2015 Shifting Topographies, Oakland, California
 2015 Coherence, Des Moines, Iowa
 2015 Nebulous, Seattle
 2015 Sensing YOU and Sensing WATER, San Jose, California

Awards

 1998 Artist Trust GAP award
 2001 PAN Year in Review Award for Cedar River Watershed Visitors Center
 2003 ASLA Washington Chapter Honor Award
 2004 ASLA Design Award of Merit for Cedar River Watershed Education Center
 2006 National AIA Housing Committee Award and AIA 2004 Seattle Honor Award
 2006 PAN Year in Review Award for Wave Rave Cave
 2007 PAN Year in Review Award for Emerald Laser Lawn
 2007 PAN Year in Review Award for Safety Spires (in collaboration with Norie Sato)
 2009 PAN Year in Review Award for Empyrean Passage
 2010 PAN Year in Review Award for Emerald Aura and Oscillating Field

References

External links
 Official web site
 Seattle's Public Art: Dan Corson, Cedar River Watershed Video
 Museum Without Walls: List and location of works by Dan Corson

1964 births
Living people
Artists from Seattle
San Diego State University alumni
University of Washington School of Art + Art History + Design alumni
People from Glendale, California
Skowhegan School of Painting and Sculpture alumni